WatchESPN was a branding of the Internet television website and mobile application operated by ESPN Inc., a joint venture between The Walt Disney Company (which operates the network, through its 80% controlling ownership interest) and Hearst Corporation (which holds the remaining 20% interest).

The service provides streaming simulcasts of ESPN, ESPN2, ESPNU, ESPNews, ESPN Deportes, ACC Network, Longhorn Network, SEC Network, ESPN Goal Line and ESPN Buzzer Beater for select cable television subscribers in the United States; it also serves as the exclusive platform for broadcasts from ESPN3, which until 2011, had operated as a separate website with a similar functionality to WatchESPN. The service is only available to subscribers of participating cable, IPTV and satellite television providers, and was not offered as a standalone internet-only subscription service available to those who do not have a pay television subscription.

On July 1, 2019, ESPN officially discontinued the WatchESPN app and branding, redirecting users to the ESPN app (which had been updated in 2015 to add integrated streaming functionality) and ESPN.com streaming.

Since the launch of the over-the-top companion service ESPN+ in 2018, ESPN has increasingly preferred paywalling new or renewed content acquisitions on that service instead of ESPN3. It is a standalone subscription product and does not require a separate television subscription.

History

As ESPN Networks

WatchESPN originally launched on October 25, 2010, when Time Warner Cable became the first cable television provider to offer ESPN Networks, which provided subscribers to ESPN an online simulcast of the channel through a dedicated website. Bright House Networks (for which Time Warner Cable handles distribution agreements) began offering ESPN Networks on November 22, 2010. On January 25, 2011, ESPN Networks added streaming simulcast feeds of ESPN2 and ESPNU, as well as out-of-market sports packages ESPN Goal Line and ESPN Buzzer Beater to the website, accessible only to subscribers of those services. Verizon FiOS began providing access to streams on the ESPN Networks website on February 17, 2011.

As WatchESPN
On April 7, 2011, ESPN released a mobile app called WatchESPN on the App Store for Apple devices, using the same subscriber authentication functionality to allow access to simulcasts of the available ESPN channels on the service via the iPhone, iPad and iPod Touch; the app was released on the Android Market (now Google Play) on May 9, 2011. The ESPN Networks website was subsequently rebranded under the WatchESPN name on August 31, 2011 (the "Watch" brand was then applied to other TV Everywhere applications for television networks owned by ESPN co-owner Disney–ABC Television Group since the launch of the service, including those for ABC, Disney Channel/XD/Junior and Freeform; this shifted to the new brandings of "Disney NOW", "The ABC App" and "The Freeform App" in 2018). On May 8, 2012, Comcast began allowing authenticated Xfinity TV customers access to WatchESPN's streams via the app, as part of a deal in which the streams available on WatchESPN would also be made available on Xfinity's 'watch now' website. On August 28, 2012, Midco began allowing access to WatchESPN's simulcasts for its customers. Charter added access to the service in mid-February 2013. Dish Network, the first satellite provider to provide access to WatchESPN, announced it had added the service on April 1, 2014.

Longhorn Network and SEC Network programs were added to the service upon SEC Network's launch on August 14, 2014 (Longhorn Network was contractually limited to Big 12 states, and not available nationwide through WatchESPN). ESPN Classic was never made available on WatchESPN due to a lack of live sports rights and licensing limitations, along with a general move to a video on demand model.

In 2015, ESPN began to deprecate the standalone WatchESPN apps in favor of the updated ESPN mobile app (originally launched in 2008 with the iPhone's original App Store as "ScoreCenter"), which contains integrated access to ESPN's TV Everywhere streaming. In 2017, ESPN began to significantly downplay the WatchESPN branding on-air, in favor of promoting the ESPN app. ESPN withdrew the WatchESPN app from the App Store and Google Play on July 1, 2019, and redirected the web presence of WatchESPN to an equivalent section on ESPN.com.

Distribution
Simulcasts of the ESPN channels available on the WatchESPN app and website (including ESPN Goal Line and ESPN Buzzer Beater) were available through TV Everywhere subscription authentication through a number of providers which expanded through the years after new carriage agreements were negotiated. In 2015, as part of a new agreement with The Walt Disney Company, DirecTV (the largest holdout among major pay TV providers) added authentication rights to WatchESPN for its subscribers. Two major IPTV providers, Dish's Sling TV and PlayStation Vue, also offered authentication to WatchESPN.

ESPN3, a similar service that had operated separately from WatchESPN until it was integrated into the service in 2011, is available through many other cable providers including those listed above. In all cases, a TV Everywhere login (or other login code for university and military customers) through a customer's service provider is required to access the services; ESPN3 is also accessible without login if the user's IP address can be traced to a participating ISP.

Channel simulcasts
ESPN
ESPN2
ESPNU
ESPNews
ESPN Deportes
ESPN Goal Line & Bases Loaded
Longhorn Network 
SEC Network & SEC Network Alternate
ACC Network

Internet-only channels
ACC Network Extra
ESPN3
Extra network streams during event coverage such as the College Football Playoff games
@ESPN (free content)

Platforms

Website
The WatchESPN.com website allowed viewers  to view and switch between up to 20 events in a main viewing window, along with on-demand access after an event's end. The WatchESPN player additionally features four modules: Featured Events (which shows viewers highlights of live and upcoming events available on WatchESPN), Stats (which features statistics from the streamed event), the Chat 140 section (which allowed fans to discussion the events with other fans; this was later withdrawn as ESPN removed commenting functionality), and Facebook connect (which connects fans to their Facebook profile and allowed them to both post about the event that they are watching on their wall and discuss the event with other Facebook fans; this was also removed when ESPN removed commenting functionality).

Mobile devices
WatchESPN was available through the ESPN app for Android and iOS, and the WatchESPN app for Windows Phone. In December 2015, WatchESPN's streaming features were integrated directly into the main ESPN app for Android and iOS, with the standalone WatchESPN app deprecated on these platforms.

Digital media players
On June 19, 2013, the service became available through Apple TV. WatchESPN became available on Roku streaming players on November 12, 2013. Chromecast support was added to the Android and iOS apps as part of an update released on June 3, 2014. Eventually, these apps became known as the ESPN app over time and added other functionality.

Windows 8/10
The WatchESPN app became available for download for compatible Windows 8 and Windows 8.1 devices from the Windows Store in February 2014, a version also compatible with Windows 10. Support for the app was withdrawn on June 30, 2017.

Video game systems
The WatchESPN service is available for download for the PlayStation 4 and Xbox One. The ESPN app for Xbox 360 was discontinued on March 23, 2016.

See also
 DisneyNow
 Hulu
 Philo
 Bally Sports app
 NBC Sports Live Extra
 FuboTV
 Eleven Sports

References

External links
WatchESPN – WatchESPN official website
espn.go.com/watchespn/faq? – WatchESPN Frequently Asked Questions page
WatchESPN mobile app on the App Store
WatchESPN mobile app on Google Play

Defunct video on demand services
ESPN media outlets